Magno Mesías Zapata (born January 8, 1981 in Chillanes, Bolívar Province) is a male race walker from Ecuador. He competed for his native country at the 2007 Pan American Games. He won the bronze medal at the Pan American Race Walking Cup in 2009 and also walked at the 2009 World Championships in Athletics, where he was 30th over 50 km. He has also taken part in the IAAF World Race Walking Cup.

Achievements

References

1981 births
Living people
Ecuadorian male racewalkers
Athletes (track and field) at the 2007 Pan American Games
People from Chillanes
Pan American Games competitors for Ecuador
World Athletics Championships athletes for Ecuador